List of metahumans in DC Comics, is a list of fictional superhumans that have appeared in comic book titles published by DC Comics, as well as properties from other media are listed below, with appropriately brief descriptions and accompanying citations.

A 

Air Wave (Harold Jordan)
Amazing Man
Anima
Aquagirl (Lorena Marquez)
Argus (Nick Kelly)
Atom (Al Pratt)
Atomic Skull
Atom Smasher (Albert Rothstein)
Argent
Aura

B 

 Ballistic (Kelvin Mao)
 Baron Bedlam
 Battalion (member of Team Titans)
 Beast Boy
 Black Canary (Dinah Laurel Lance)
 Black Condor (Richard Grey, Jr.)
 Black Condor (Ryan Kendall)
 Black Condor (John Trujillo)
 Black Lightning
 Black, Manchester
 Blimp (member of Inferior Five)
 Blindside (member of Relative Heroes)
 Brahma (member of the Supermen of America)
 Brainwave (Henry King, Sr.)
 Brainwave (Henry King, Jr.)
 Brick
 Bumblebee (Karen Beecher-Duncan)
 Blackout

C 

 Captain Boomerang (Owen Mercer)
 Captain Comet
 Carr, Snapper
 Casey Krinsky
 Celsius
 Centrix
 Chain Lightning
 Chase, Cameron
 Chiller
 Chimera
 Chunk
 Cicada 
 Clock King (member of the Terror Titans)
 Codename: Assassin
 Coldcast
 Coldsnap (member of the Masters of Disaster)
 Corrosive Man
 Count Vertigo
 Crazy Jane
 Crystallex
 Cyclone
 Cyclotron
 Creegan, Ned

D 

 Damage
 Dan the Dyna-Mite
 Deuce and Charger
 Deadline
 Deathbolt
 Deathstroke
 Deep Blue (daughter of Tsunami)
 Dervish
 Diamondette (member of Hero Hotline)
 Doctor Alchemy
 Doctor Double X
 Doctor Light (Arthur Light)
 Doctor Light (Kimiyo Hoshi)
 Doctor Manhattan
 Doctor Midnight (Beth Chapel)
 Doctor Mid-Nite (Charles McNider)
 Doctor Mid-Nite (Pieter Cross)
 Doctor Phosphorus
 Doctor Polaris
 Doctor Psycho
 Doctor Regulus (enemy of Sun Boy)
 Doll Girl
 Doll Man (Darrell Dane)
 Doll Man (Lester Colt)
 Dolphin
 Dumb Bunny (member of the Inferior Five)
 Dust Devil (member of the Blasters)

E 

 Earthworm (Batman counter)
 Echo (member of the Conglomerate)
 Edge (a New Blood)
 El Dorado
 Elasti-Girl
 Electron
 Electrocutioner
 Elephant Man
 Elongated Man
 Epsilon (Teen Titans villain)

F 

 Faith
 Fastball
 Father Time
 Fever (member of the Doom Patrol)
 Fire
 Firebird (member of Soyuz)
 Firebrand
 Firehawk
 Firestorm (Ronald Raymond)
 Firestorm (Jason Rusch)
 Flash (Barry Allen)
 Flash (Bart Allen)
 Flash (Jay Garrick)
 Flash (Wally West)
 Flex Mentallo
 Floronic Man
 Fog (Nazi villain from World War II)
 Freedom Beast
 Fright
 Frostbite (member of Young Heroes)
 Fallout

G 

 Gehenna
 Geist
 Gemini
 General Computron
 Geo-Force
 Geomancer
 Giganta
 Gloss
 Godiva
 Goldface
 Goldilocks
 Goraiko (member of the International Ultramarine Corps)
 Gorgon
 Green Arrow (Conner Hawke)
 Green Lantern (Alan Scott)
 Gunfire
 Gypsy

H 

 Halo
 Hammond, Hector
 Harbinger
 Harley Quinn
 Hardrock (ally of Superboy)
 Harpi (member of the Hybrid)
 Hazard
 Heatstroke (member of the Masters of Disaster)
 Hector Hammond
 Hellgrammite
 Hitman
 Hook (a New Blood)
 Hourman (Rex Tyler)
 Hourman (Rick Tyler)
 Human Bomb
 Hypnota
 Hot Spot (Isaiah Crockett)

I 

Icemaiden (alias Sigrid Nansen)
Icicle II (Cameron Mahkent)
Impulse (Bart Allen)
Inertia
I.Q.
Iron Munro

J 

Jack B. Quick
Jackal
Jaculi I and II (members of the Onslaught)
Jade
Jamm (a New Blood)
Jericho
Jesse Quick (Jesse Chambers)
Jet (alias Celia Windward)
Jinx
Johnny Quick (Johnny Chambers)
Jonni Thunder
Josiah Power
Judomaster

K 

Kalki (father of Celsius)
Karma (member of the Doom Patrol)
Key
Kid Flash
Kid Slick (member of the Doom Patrol)
Killer Croc
Killer Frost I and II
Killer Wasp I and II
Killowat
King Shark
Kole (alias Kole Weathers)
Kong Kenan
Krag (a New Blood)
Kryptonite Man
Kung

L 

Lady Clay
Lady Flash
Lady Liberty
Lady Lunar
Lady Quark
Lady Spellbinder
Lady Zand
Larvanaut
Layla (a New Blood)
Leather
Lightning II
Lilith
Lion-Mane
Livewire
Looker
Loose Cannon

M 

Madame Rouge (alias Laura DeMille)
Magenta
Magno (Quality Comics)
Magno (Modern Age)
Major Disaster
Melvin (Teen Titans)
Mammoth
Man-Bat
Manfred Mota
Manticore (member of the Global Guardians)
Más y Menos (see also Teen Titans animated series)
Matter Master
Maxi-Man
Maxwell Lord
Max Mercury
Mayflower
Mento
Metamorpho
Minddancer
Mindboggler
Mind-Grabber Kid
Mirage
Miss America
Mist I and II
Mister 104
Mister Bones
Mister Element I and II
Mister ESPer
Mister Freeze
Mister Nobody
Molecule
Mongrel (member of the Blood Pack)
Monsoon
Morozko (member of Soyuz)
Muhammad X
Multi-Man
Multiplex
Mystek

N 

Naiad
Negative Man (Ted Bruder)
Nemesis Kid
Neon the Unknown
Neptune Perkins
Network
Neutron
New Wave (member of the Masters of Disaster)
Night (partner of Fog)
Nightblade (member of the Blood Pack)
Nimbus
Northwind
Nox (member of the New Olympians)
Nudge

O 

Obsidian
Off-Ramp (member of Young Heroes)
Offspring
Ohm
Omen
Orca
Outburst
Outlaw (member of the Suicide Squad)
Overthrow
Owlwoman

P 

Panara
Paper Man
Paragon
Peek-A-Boo
Penny Dreadful (member of the Helix)
Perun (member of Soyuz)
Phantasm (Danny Chase)
Phobia (alias Angela Hawkins III)
Planetmaster
Plantmaster
Plasmus (alias Otto Von Furth)
Plastic Man
Plastique
Poison Ivy
Pozhar
Pravda (member of the People's Heroes)
Praxis (member of the Conglomerate)
Professor Radium
Professor Zoom (see Reverse-Flash)
Psilencer (member of the Young Supermen of America)
Psi
Psimon
Power Girl
Pulse 8 (member of the International Ultramarine Corps)
Pyrogen (member of the Young Supermen of America)
Parasite

R 

Radiant
Radiation Roy
Radion
Ram (Takeo Yakata)
Rampage
Rampart (member of Sovereign Seven)
Ray (Ray Terrill)
Razorsharp (a New Blood)
Reactron
Red King
Red Star
Red Trinity (team)
Redwing (member of Team Titans)
Resurrection Man
Reverb
Reverse-Flash
Rising Sun
Rival (see Reverse-Flash)
Rhea Jones (alias Lodestone)
Rose Wilson
Rusalka (member of Soyuz)

S 

Sand (formerly Sandy the Golden Boy)
Sandstorm (member of the Global Guardians)
Sapphire (latent telekinetic)
Scarecrow
Silver Banshee
Savitar
Scandal Savage
Scirocco (member of the Hybrid)
Scorch
Seneca (member of the Cadre of the Immortal)
Shadowstryke (a New Blood)
Shakedown
Shimmer
Shockwave
Silent Majority
Sister Superior
Sizematic Twins
Skorpio
Sledge
Slingshot (a New Blood)
Socialist Red Guardsman
Solution (Teen Titans candidate)
Sonar I and II
Soyuz (team)
Sparkler
Sparx (a New Blood)
Spinner, Dorothy
Stalnoivolk
Static
Steel (John Henry Irons)
Striker Z
Sudden Death
Sunburst
Sun Girl
Sweet 16 (Teen Titans candidate)

T 

Tao Jones (member of Helix)
Tar Pit
Tasmanian Devil
Tempest (Garth)
Tempest (Joshua Clay)
Ten-Eyed Man
Terra
Troia (Donna Troy)
Thorn I
Thunder II
Thunderlord
Thunder and Lightning
TNT
Tobias Whale
Tokamak
Tomorrow Woman (post-Trinity)
Top
Touch-N-Go (member of the Hybrid)
Triumph
Tsunami
Tuatara
Tundra (member of the Global Guardians)
Typhoon
Tyroc

V 

Vandal Savage
Vanquisher I and II
Vapor (member of the Conglomerate)
Vault
Velvet Tiger (comics)
Vibe
Vikhor (member of Soyuz)
Volcana
Volt (from Team Titans)
Vox (Mal Duncan)
Vulcan (metavirus)
Vixen

W 

War Maker One (member of the International Ultramarine Corps)
Warp (alias Emil LaSalle)
Weather Wizard (no longer needs wand)
White Lotus (comics) (member of the Supermen of America)
Wildcat II
Wildcat III
Windfall
Windshear
Wonder Girl (Cassie Sandsmark)
Wonder Woman

X 

XS

Z 

Zapatak (member of Xenobrood)
Zookeeper (Dr. Samuel Register)
Zoom
Zyklon

List
Metahumans